The Roteck is the highest peak in the Texel group of the Ötztal Alps.

See also
 List of mountains of the Alps

Mountains of South Tyrol
Mountains of the Alps
Alpine three-thousanders
Ötztal Alps